Corned beef pie is made from corned beef, onion and often thinly sliced, cubed or mashed potato. It can be eaten hot or cold, making it a suitable common picnic food and also a 'winter warmer'. The corned beef from which the pie derives its name may be leftover corned beef, as from a Sunday dinner, or tinned Bully beef. The pie may be made with a mashed potato topping, as in Shepherd's pie, or with a traditional pastry crust.

See also 

 Cottage pie
 List of pies, tarts and flans
 List of potato dishes

References 

British pies
English cuisine
New Zealand pies
Potato dishes
Savoury pies